This is a list of Roman canals. Roman canals were typically multi-purpose structures, intended for irrigation, drainage, land reclamation, flood control and navigation where feasible. This list focuses on the larger canals, particularly navigational canals, as recorded by ancient geographers and still traceable by modern archaeology. Channels which served the needs of urban water supply are covered at the List of aqueducts in the Roman Empire.

Greek engineers were the first to use canal locks, by which they regulated the water flow in the Ancient Suez Canal as early as the 3rd century BC. The Romans under Trajan too secured the entrance to the Red Sea with sluice gates, while they extended the canal south to the height of modern Cairo in order to improve its water inflow. The existence of ancient pound locks to bridge height gaps has been proposed by a number of authors, but in the absence of clear archaeological evidence the question seems to be permanently undecided.

Canals 
By chronological order:

Italy

Gaul

Germania

Britain

Egypt

Moesia

Projected canals 
In the following, Roman canal projects which were never completed for various reasons are listed.

See also 
Record-holding canals in antiquity

References

Sources 
Froriep, Siegfried (1986): "Ein Wasserweg in Bithynien. Bemühungen der Römer, Byzantiner und Osmanen", Antike Welt, 2nd Special Edition, pp. 39–50
Grewe, Klaus (2008): "Tunnels and Canals", in: Oleson, John Peter (ed.): The Oxford Handbook of Engineering and Technology in the Classical World, Oxford University Press, pp. 319–336, 
Moore, Frank Gardner (1950): "Three Canal Projects, Roman and Byzantine", American Journal of Archaeology, Vol. 54, No. 2, pp. 97–111
Schörner, Hadwiga (2000): "Künstliche Schiffahrtskanäle in der Antike. Der sogenannte antike Suez-Kanal", Skyllis, Vol. 3, No. 1, pp. 28–43
Serban, Marko (2009): "Trajan’s Bridge over the Danube", The International Journal of Nautical Archaeology, Vol. 38, No. 2, pp. 331–342
Tudor, D. (1974): Les ponts romains du Bas-Danube, Bibliotheca Historica Romaniae Études, Vol. 51, Bucharest: Editura Academiei Republicii Socialiste România, pp. 47–134
White, K. D. (1984): Greek and Roman Technology, London: Thames and Hudson, pp. 110–112; 227–229, table 6
Wikander, Charlotte (2000): "Canals", in Wikander, Örjan (ed.): Handbook of Ancient Water Technology, Technology and Change in History, Vol. 2, Leiden: Brill, pp. 321–330,

Further reading 
Redmount, Carol A. (1995): "The Wadi Tumilat and the 'Canal of the Pharaohs'", Journal of Near Eastern Studies, Vol. 54, No. 2, pp. 127–135
Smith, N.A.F. (1977/78): "Roman Canals", Transactions of the Newcomen Society, Vol. 49, pp. 75–86

External links 

Livius.org: Fossa Drusiana
Livius.org: Fossa Corbulonis
Telegraph.co.uk: 'Biggest Canal Ever Built by Romans' Discovered

 
Canals